Secoisolariciresinol dehydrogenase is an enzyme with the systematic name (-)-secoisolariciresinol:NAD+ oxidoreductase. This enzyme catalyses the following chemical reaction:

 (-)-secoisolariciresinol + 2 NAD+  (-)-matairesinol + 2 NADH + 2 H+

This enzyme is isolated from the plants Forsythia intermedia and Podophyllum peltatum.

References

External links 
 

EC 1.1.1